Pender County is a county located in the U.S. state of North Carolina. As of the 2020 census, the population was 60,203. Its county seat is Burgaw. Pender County is part of the Wilmington, NC Metropolitan Statistical Area.

History
The county was formed in 1875 from New Hanover County. It was named for William Dorsey Pender of Edgecombe County, a Confederate general mortally wounded at the Battle of Gettysburg. It is in the southeastern section of the state and is bounded by the Atlantic Ocean and New Hanover, Brunswick, Columbus, Bladen, Sampson, Duplin, and Onslow counties. The estimated county population in 2019 had increased to 63,060. The county commissioners were ordered to hold their first meeting at Rocky Point. The act provided for the establishment of the town of Cowan as the county seat. In 1877, an act was passed repealing that section of the law relative to the town, and another law was enacted, whereby the qualified voters were to vote on the question of moving the county seat to South Washington or any other place which the majority of the voters designated. Whatever place was selected, the town should be called Stanford. In 1879, Stanford was changed to Burgaw, which was by that law incorporated. It is the county seat. A slave cemetery that was used by the community of Cardinal Acres up until circa 1950 was disturbed by a developer grading a site in 2021.

Geography

It is the fifth-largest county in North Carolina by land area.

National protected area 
 Moores Creek National Battlefield

State and local protected areas 
 Angola Bay Game Land (part)
 Bellhammon Tract (part)
 Canetuck Tract
 Holly Shelter Game Land (part)
 Lea-Hutaff Island State Natural Area
 Sandy Run Savannas State Natural Area (part)

Major water bodies 
 Atlantic Ocean
 Black River, home of the oldest documented Taxodium distichum (bald cypress) at  years old, located in Bladen County
 Cape Fear River
 Doctor's Creek
 Intracoastal Waterway
 Northeast Cape Fear River
 Onslow Bay

Adjacent counties
 Duplin County — north
 Onslow County — northeast
 New Hanover County — south
 Brunswick County — south
 Columbus County — southwest
 Bladen County — west
 Sampson County — northwest

Major highways

 
 
  (To be the Military Cutoff Extension and the Hampstead Bypass starting in New Hanover County)

Demographics

2020 census

As of the 2020 United States census, there were 60,203 people, 21,740 households, and 14,676 families residing in the county.

2000 census
As of the census of 2000, there were 41,082 people, 16,054 households, and 11,719 families residing in the county.  The population density was 47 people per square mile (18/km2).  There were 20,798 housing units at an average density of 24 per square mile (9/km2).  The racial makeup of the county was 72.74% White, 23.58% Black or African American, 0.49% Native American, 0.18% Asian, 0.03% Pacific Islander, 2.03% from other races, and 0.94% from two or more races.  3.64% of the population were Hispanic or Latino of any race.

There were 16,054 households, out of which 29.40% had children under the age of 18 living with them, 57.90% were married couples living together, 11.20% had a female householder with no husband present, and 27.00% were non-families. 22.90% of all households were made up of individuals, and 8.50% had someone living alone who was 65 years of age or older.  The average household size was 2.49 and the average family size was 2.90.

In the county, the population was spread out, with 23.20% under the age of 18, 7.40% from 18 to 24, 29.50% from 25 to 44, 25.80% from 45 to 64, and 14.10% who were 65 years of age or older.  The median age was 39 years. For every 100 females there were 101.20 males.  For every 100 females age 18 and over, there were 99.50 males.

The median income for a household in the county was $35,902, and the median income for a family was $41,633. Males had a median income of $31,424 versus $21,623 for females. The per capita income for the county was $17,882.  About 9.50% of families and 13.60% of the population were below the poverty line, including 18.60% of those under age 18 and 14.40% of those age 65 or over.

Government and politics
Pender County is a member of the regional Cape Fear Council of Governments. The government is run by a board of commissioners with a county manager.

Pender County is a strong Republican county, it has voted with the party since 1996. In the 1992 U.S presidential election, Democratic nominee Bill Clinton won the county. In the 2016 U.S presidential election, Republican nominee Donald Trump won the county with 63.3% of the vote, over Democratic nominee Hillary Clinton's 33.5%.

Education
The county is served by Pender County Schools.

Communities

Towns
 Atkinson
 Burgaw (county seat)
 Surf City
 Topsail Beach
 Wallace
 Watha

Village
 St. Helena

Census-designated places
 Hampstead (largest community)
 Long Creek
 Rocky Point

Other unincorporated communities
 Charity
 Currie
 Montague
 Register
 Sloop Point
 Willard
 Yamacraw

Townships

 Burgaw
 Canetuck
 Caswell
 Columbia
 Grady
 Holly
 Long Creek
 Rocky Point
 Topsail
 Union

Notable people
 John Baptista Ashe, born in Rocky Point township, delegate to the Continental Congress
 John Baptista Ashe, born in Rocky Point township, nephew of the above, United States Congressman from North Carolina
 William Shepperd Ashe, born in Rocky Point township, United States Congressman from North Carolina

See also
 List of counties in North Carolina
 National Register of Historic Places listings in Pender County, North Carolina
 Films and television shows produced in Wilmington, North Carolina
 Cape Fear Museum, located in Wilmington, New Hanover County
 List of North Carolina State Parks#State Natural Areas
 National battlefield
 North Carolina in the American Civil War

References

External links

 
 
 NCGenWeb Pender County—free genealogy resources for the county

 
Cape Fear (region)
1875 establishments in North Carolina
Populated places established in 1875